Crassula colorata, the dense pigmyweed or dense stonecrop, is an annual plant in the family Crassulaceae. The species is endemic to Australia, occurring in Western Australia, South Australia, New South Wales and Victoria.

It produces green-red-yellow flowers between August and October.

It is found amongst rocky outcrops, along road-sides and on low-lying areas where it grows in sandy-loamy soils over ironstone or granite.

There are three known varieties of the species;
 Crassula colorata var. acuminata (Reader) Toelken
 Crassula colorata var. (Nees) Ostenf. var. colorata	
 Crassula colorata var. miriamiae (Ostenf.) Toelken

References

colorata
Flora of New South Wales
Flora of South Australia
Flora of Victoria (Australia)
Eudicots of Western Australia
Saxifragales of Australia
Plants described in 1918